Baldwin Township, Michigan may refer to:

 Baldwin Township, Delta County, Michigan
 Baldwin Township, Iosco County, Michigan

See also 
 Baldwin, Michigan, a village in Lake County
 Baldwin Township (disambiguation)

Michigan township disambiguation pages